Maytree may refer to:

 May pole
 Crataegus commonly called hawthorn, or hawberry
 Maytree (organisation) respite centre, located in the London Borough of Islington, England, 
 Maytree (band), Korean band
 Maytree Travel

See also 
 Prunus padus, the "Mayday tree"